Reitoca is a municipality in the Honduran department of Francisco Morazán.

The name derives from Rerituca, which means "Place of the soft juncus" in Nahuatl.

Municipalities of the Francisco Morazán Department